Sunrise Adams is an American author and pornographic actress.

Early life
Sunrise Adams was born in St. Louis, Missouri and raised in Pickton, Texas. In high school she played football, making her the first girl to play the sport in her high school's history.

Career
In 2002, Adams shot an episode for the Cinemax softcore series The Best Sex Ever called "House Sitting". After years of mainstream modeling, including for Pony International, Adams signed with Vivid Entertainment. One of her favorite directors to work with became Chi Chi LaRue.

Her first movie with Vivid was Portrait of Sunrise. She was nominated for Best Actress by AVN in 2003, losing to Jenna Haze. That same year, she appeared in the skateboarding movie Grind. In June 2003, she appeared with Steve Hirsch on Your World with Neil Cavuto.

In 2004, she won the award for Best Oral Sex Scene – Film, alongside Randy Spears, for Heart of Darkness. On August 2, 2004, she appeared with Savanna Samson on Fox News's The O'Reilly Factor, to promote their book How to Have a XXX Sex Life. Weeks later, Adams and Samson were named in a lawsuit by Fox News producer Andrea Mackris that The O'Reilly Factor host Bill O'Reilly "launched into a vile and degrading monologue about sex" on the phone to Mackris immediately after the two porn stars appeared on the air. In 2005,  Adams ended her contract with Vivid Entertainment to pursue a relationship with someone who Adams described as wanting her to "be normal." She moved back to Texas and worked as a loan officer and in real estate.

Adams returned to the porn industry and signed a contract with Vivid Entertainment in 2006. Upon her return, she decided to "do it all" as she expanded to include lesbian sex scenes for the first time in her career. She performed scenes with Hillary Scott and Sunny Lane. That same year, she launched her first website, which has since been taken down.

Personal life
Adams is the niece of porn star Sunset Thomas. As of 2003, Adams had a boyfriend, with whom she was actively investing in real estate. Adams was also pursuing a college degree in business management.

Further reading
Works by Sunrise Adams
with Vivid Girls. How to Have a XXX Sex Life: The Ultimate Vivid Guide. New York: It Books (2001). 
The Lust Ranch: A Vivid Girls Book. Philadelphia: Running Press (2005). 

Works about Sunrise Adams
Greenfield-Sanders, Timothy. XXX: 30 Porn-Star Portraits. New York: Bulfinch (2004).

Awards
 2003 Venus Award - Best New Starlet (USA)
 2004 AVN Award - Best Oral Sex Scene, Film (Heart of Darkness) with Randy Spears

References

External links

 
 
 

American pornographic film actresses
Living people
People from Hopkins County, Texas
Pornographic film actors from Texas
21st-century American women writers
Pornographic film actors from Missouri
Writers from St. Louis
Actresses from St. Louis
Writers from Texas
Women erotica writers
Year of birth missing (living people)